Reshaping Cultural Policies (styled as  Re|Shaping Cultural Policies) is a report series published by UNESCO which monitors the implementation of the UNESCO Convention on the Protection and Promotion of the Diversity of Cultural Expressions (2005). The 2005 UNESCO Convention encourages its 146 parties to introduce policies for culture within a global context and commitment to protect and promote the diversity of cultural expressions. The second and most recent report (2018) subtitled “Advancing Creativity for Development” follows the first report (2015) with the subtitle “A Decade Promoting the Diversity of Cultural Expressions for Development”.

Primarily, the report series draws on reports of all parties to the Convention submitted every four years in which they present and describe the actions they have taken in order to implement the Convention. These reports are called quadrennial periodic reports (QPRs). In addition, the report series includes the analysis of other both governmental and non-governmental sources. In general, the report investigates how implementing the convention reshapes cultural policies. Additionally, it provides evidence of how the implementation process contributes to attaining the United Nations 2030 Sustainable Development Goals (SDGs) to end poverty, protect the planet, and ensure prosperity for every human being. The report series also analyses trends and issues concerning the creative economy, which currently is worth $2,250 billion and employs 30 million people worldwide.

The report puts forward a set of policy recommendations for the future, addressing the adaptation of cultural policies to rapid change in the digital environment, based on human rights and fundamental freedoms of expression.

“Each Report is not an end-result, but a tool to be used in a long-term process that includes the forging of spaces for policy dialogue, reinforcing stakeholders’ capacities to work together to generate data and information, and advocate for policy innovation both nationally and globally.” 

The reports are published in English, French, Spanish, Russian, Portuguese, Arabic, Chinese, Indonesian, Vietnamese and German. UNESCO is the lead institutional author of the Global Report series and coordinates a broader network of independent experts who author chapters.

In line with the Parties’ quadrennial periodic reporting, the series is produced every four years. The first cycle spanned the years 2012-2015 and the second runs from 2016 to 2019. Accordingly, the third publication will take place in December 2021.



Convention on the Protection and Promotion of the Diversity of Cultural Expressions (2005) 

The 2005 Convention is an international standard setting instrument providing a framework for the governance of culture. In this context, governance of culture refers to policies and measures governments establish to regulate, to promote and to protect all forms of creativity and artistic expressions. The most recent UNESCO Convention in the field of culture and ratified by 146 parties, it is the first international legal tool to encourage governments to invest in creativity. It frames the formulation and implementation of different types of legislative, regulatory, institutional and financial interventions to promote the emergence of dynamic cultural and creative industry sectors around the world.

Within the context of the 2005 Convention, the diversity of cultural expressions ″refers to the manifold ways in which the cultures of groups and societies find expression. These expressions are passed on within and among groups and societies″. Specifically, the Convention understands cultural expressions as all forms of creativity and artistic expressions, such as in cinema/audiovisual arts, design, digital arts, music, performing arts, publishing and the visual arts. The 2005 Convention was "since its beginnings, permeated by a material and economic perspective of cultural expressions, focused on the production and consumption of cultural goods and services, with a view to promote more balanced exchanges and sustainable development that takes into account cultural diversity concerns."

The implementation of the 2005 Convention aims to contribute to achieving several Sustainable Development Goals (SDGs), precisely SDG 4 (Quality Education), SDG 5 (Gender Equality), SDG 8 (Decent Work and Economic Growth), SDG 10 (Reduced Inequalities), SDG 16 (Peace, Justice and Strong Institutions) and SDG 17 (Partnerships for the Goals). The implementation process identifies investing in creativity as a priority for sustainable development. At the global level, the convention calls for countries to provide financial assistance for creativity through their Official Development Assistance (ODA) by investing in the Convention’s International Fund for Cultural Diversity. Additionally, UNESCO, through the 2005 Convention, offers technical assistance to strengthen human and institutional capacities in developing countries.

Content 
The director general of UNESCO, Audrey Azoulay referring to the UNESCO General Conference's conviction that cultural activities, goods and services have both an economic and a cultural nature stated: ″[c]ulture is not a commodity: it carries values and identities, it gives markers to live together in a globalized world. Our role is to encourage, question, collect data, to understand and energize creative channels, to encourage the mobility of artists, to stimulate a rapidly changing sector in the new digital environment″. Annika Markovic, Ambassador and Permanent Delegate of Sweden to UNESCO, in 2018, claimed that the report is “the only global document that presents an overview of cultural development world-wide and monitors state action to protect and promote the diversity of cultural expressions at all levels.” 

The following aspects thematically summarize the core findings identified by the 2018 report with regard to the implementation of the 2005 UNESCO Convention.

Culture & sustainable development 
For the first time, national development plans and strategies integrate culture, mainly of countries in the Global South. As a result, cities seem to invest more and more in cultural industries for development. The UN’s 2030 Agenda recognized the role of creativity in sustainable development in the implementation of the SDGs. However, the share of development aid spent on culture today is the lowest it has been in over 10 years.

Cultural expressions in the digital age 
According to the report, digital revenues make up 50% of the recorded music market, growing almost 18% over the past year due to a sharp increase in the share of streaming revenues.

The report states that the internet transforms the cultural value chain into a network platform. E-commerce challenges both culture and trade policies that intend to promote the diversity of cultural expressions. It articulates the urgency to improve data collection on revenues generated through digital channels in order to design better policies and negotiate fair trade agreements. The report claims that monitoring the relationship between large platforms, Big Data, artificial intelligence and the diversity of cultural expressions is crucial to ensure that a variety of distribution platforms and providers promote and protect future artistic creations.

Artistic freedom 
As informed by the report, attacks against artists have increased in the past years, including in the digital environment where surveillance and online trolling pose new threats to artistic freedom. In 2016, 430 cases were reported around the world (compared to 340 in 2015 and 90 in 2014). Musicians are the most threatened group, while authors also often become a target.  In 2016, attacks against authors occurred most often in the Asia-Pacific Region (80 cases), the Middle East and North Africa (51 cases) and Europe (47 cases). The report reveals that meanwhile, there exists an increased awareness with regard to such threats leading to a larger number of initiatives to support the social and economic rights of artists, particularly in African countries. While there exists legal action to affirm the freedom of expression for artists, other laws addressing terrorism and state security repress artistic expressions.

Gender equality in cultural and creative industries 

The report states that half of the persons working in the cultural and creative industries are female. However, a gender gap persists worldwide concerning equal pay, access to funding and prices charged for creative works. Consequently, women remain under-represented in key creative roles and are outnumbered in decision-making positions. Women make up only 34% of Ministers for Culture (compared to 24% in 2005) and only 31% of national arts program directors. Generally, women are represented in specific cultural fields such as arts education and training (60%), book publishing and press (54%), audiovisual and interactive media (26%), as well as design and creative services (33%).

Mobility of artists and cultural professionals 

The report demonstrates that predominantly restrictions in terms of mobility represent great challenges to persons pursuing careers in the cultural and creative industries, specifically to those from the Global South.  It reveals that a holder of a German passport can travel to 176 countries without a visa while a holder of an Afghan passport can only travel to 24 countries without a visa. As a matter of fact, artists and cultural professionals need to travel to perform, to reach new audiences or to attend a residency or to engage in networking. The report exposes that travel restrictions, including difficulties in obtaining visas oftentimes impedes artists from the Global South to participate in art biennales or film festivals, even when invited to receive an award or to promote their works.

Governance of culture 
As stated in the report, the 2005 Convention provides legitimacy for the formulation of cultural policies and their adaptation to changing circumstances and needs. The report underscores that collaborative governance and multi-stakeholder policy making have progressed, notably in some developing countries particularly in the creative economy and cultural education. As a result, parties to the Convention have made considerable progress in fostering digital arts creation, supporting creative entrepreneurship, accelerating the modernization of cultural sectors, promoting distribution and updating copyright legislation. However, the report also reveals a lack in civil society participation in policy making. It underlines the urgency for more effort to ensure the creation of open, transparent and participatory policy processes in order to involve civil society participation in policy making.

Trade and investment in cultural goods and services 
In accordance with the report, the 2005 Convention formally recognizes that cultural goods and services not only have important economic value, but also convey identities, meanings and values. As a consequence, at least eight bilateral and regional free trade agreements concluded between 2015 and 2017 have introduced cultural clauses or list of commitments that promote the objectives and principles of the 2005 Convention. Despite the lack of the promotion of the objectives and principles of the 2005 Convention with regard to the negotiation of mega-regional partnership agreements, some Parties to the Trans Pacific Partnership (TTP) have succeeded in introducing important cultural reservations to protect and promote the diversity of cultural expressions.

Next steps 
The report’s primary objective is “to provide key actors with better knowledge on how to support evidence-based policy, and to strengthen informed, transparent and participatory systems of governance for culture.”  It aims to motivate governments and civil society actors to integrate findings and recommendations into their national cultural policy and development strategies and frameworks.

Following the findings presented above, the implementation of the 2005 Convention "introduce[s] a range of different policy strategies for integrating culture into development processes"  and culture is increasingly regarded as "an economic asset in pursuing sustainable development". Based on its analysis and findings, the Global Report of 2018 suggests the following road map for the parties to the 2005 Convention. Accordingly, parties could tackle major challenges in the implementation of the 2005 Convention by:

 Streamlining and harmonizing data and information required for national and global monitoring purposes;
 Encouraging research networks and statistical offices around the world to use the Global Report monitoring framework, its core indicators and means of verification as a basis for their data collection and the establishing of statistical baselines;
 Filling existing data gaps identified in the two Global reports referring to key cultural policy areas, such as trade in cultural services, mobility flows, culture in the digital environment, or gender-disaggregated data;
 Raising awareness among policy decision makers for cultural policy reforms;
 Building capacities on policy monitoring;
 Sensitizing the development community with regard to the creative sector's potential not only contributes to the creation of jobs and income, but also catalyzes innovation, permeating traditional development areas such as education and gender equality, and brings about change.

Challenges  
Speaking about the visibility of the progress in cultural policies shown by the report series, Bárbara Lovrinić stated that “[u]nfortunately, where UNESCO is concerned, there is a lack of promotion in the media in general. In the long term, the report could have a positive impact on these issues, which would be enhanced if the public were made more aware of such work.” She also points out that there is "a risk that many people will not dwell on the 2005 Convention and the Sustainable Development Goals unless they are already somewhat familiar with the topic.” With reference to the title of the report series, she concludes that "cultural policy-making is still far from being reshaped, for it takes a serious amount of time to yield valuable results.”

See also 
Artistic Freedom
Creative Industries
Creativity
UN 2030 Sustainable Development Goals
UNESCO Institute for Statistics

References

External links 
Global Report 2015
Global Report 2018
2005 Convention Brochure: Investing in Creativity
UNESCO website section for the Diversity of Cultural Expressions
Sustainable Development Goals
Reshaping cultural policies

UNESCO
United Nations reports
Art and culture treaties
UNESCO treaties